This is a list of newspapers in Jamaica:
 Daily Star
The Daily Gleaner, the oldest Jamaican daily published by Gleaner Company, founded in 1834, oldest continually published, English language newspaper in the Western Hemisphere
 The Agriculturalist, the oldest and most consistent agricultural newspaper in the Caribbean for 28 years. Published by Patrick Maitland
 The Jamaica Churchman 
 Jamaica Herald
Jamaica Information Service (JIS), information and news service of the Jamaican Government
Jamaica Observer, Jamaican daily
The Jamaica Star (1951–present), Jamaican daily
Jamaican Times
Royal Gazette
Western Mirror

Defunct newspapers
 Jamaica despatch, and Kingston chronicle ceased between 1839 and 1841, 
 Jamaica Courant, 
 Abeng, weekly newspaper published in 1969
 Daily News, daily newspaper published in 1970s-80s (?)
 Weekly Jamaica Courant, weekly newspaper published in Kingston, Jamaica, 17181755

See also
 List of newspapers

References

Bibliography

External links
 
 

Jamaica

Newspapers